Angela Leong On-kei (born 23 March 1960) is a Macau billionaire businesswoman and politician. She is a member of the Legislative Council of Macau.

Early life
Leong was born in Guangzhou, China with family roots in Sanshui, Guangdong.

Career
In September 2017, she bought Aldwych House in London for about £250 million. As of September 2019, she had an estimated net worth of US$4.1 billion.

Leong founded Macau Sanshui Communal Association to provide social services to new immigrants. With the support of her husband to reflect the casino interests in the political scene, Leong entered electoral politics in 2005 and has then served as a directly elected legislator. The mobilization of both the working class and casino employees, a key building block of the Macau middle class, is key to Leong's political career.

She is the director of the Sociedade de Jogos de Macau, a casino company owned by Stanley Ho, since its founding and the managing director since December 2010, and the vice-chairman of the Macau Jockey Club.

With her new appointment as the chairperson of Po Leung Kuk, she has also become the supervisor of PLK Vicwood KT Chong Sixth Form College.

Personal life
She met Stanley Ho, a Macau casino tycoon famous in the political and entertainment industries in Hong Kong and Macau, 40 years her senior, when she was a dance teacher in 1986. She became his fourth partner and had four children with him: Sabrina Ho, Arnaldo Ho, Mario Ho and Alice Ho.

Election results

See also
 List of members of the Legislative Assembly of Macau

References

External links 
 
Angela Leong's information in Macau Legislative Council

1961 births
Living people
Billionaires from Guangdong
Businesspeople from Guangzhou
Businesspeople in the casino industry
Macau billionaires
Macau businesspeople
Macau women in politics
Members of the Legislative Assembly of Macau
Politicians from Guangzhou
Recipients of the Bronze Bauhinia Star